"Cornerstone" is a song by the English indie rock band Arctic Monkeys, released as the second single from their third album Humbug. It was released on 16 November 2009. Like the previous single "Crying Lightning", the vinyl was made available in Oxfam shops. Alex Turner told Uncut magazine that he wrote this song, "one morning, quite quickly." He added: "There's something to be said for writing in the morning. At other points in the day you're a bit more defensive. I saw it as a challenge to write something in a major key, but that wasn't cheesy." It was originally written in the key of A major. In October 2013, it was sampled by the rapper Dom Kennedy for the song "Pleeze" on his album Get Home Safely.

Music video
The music video for the single debuted on Channel 4 in the UK on 15 October 2009.

The music video, directed by Richard Ayoade, who worked on the videos of "Fluorescent Adolescent", "Crying Lightning" and their At the Apollo DVD, shows frontman Alex Turner singing the song alone in a white room holding a cassette recorder and microphone during the whole video. The other members of the band (Jamie Cook, Matt Helders and Nick O'Malley) are not present in the video.

Track listing

Credits and personnel
Arctic Monkeys
Alex Turner – vocals, rhythm guitar
Jamie Cook – lead guitar
Nick O'Malley – bass guitar
Matt Helders – drums
 
Additional musicians
John Ashton – keyboards

Charts
Being released as an EP in Oxfam shops, the single charted at number 94 in the UK charts and charted at number seven on the UK indie charts. It also debuted at number seven on the SoundScan singles charts for sales in Canada. One of the single's B-sides, "Sketchead", peaked at number 80 on the UK Singles Chart, fourteen places higher than "Cornerstone"'s peak position.

Certifications

References

2009 singles
2009 songs
Arctic Monkeys songs
Charity singles
Songs about loneliness
Song recordings produced by James Ford (musician)
Songs written by Alex Turner (musician)